Gummadi Vittal Rao (born 1949), popularly known as Gaddar, is an Indian poet, revolutionary balladeer, activist and a former naxalite. Gaddar was active in the Naxalite movement till 2010, and later joined the movement for Telangana's statehood.

Early life 
Gaddar went underground in the 1980s and became a member of Communist Party of India (Marxist–Leninist) People's War. He was part of its cultural wing and performed in from of the crowds. He has a bullet in spine as a result of a failed assassination in 1997.

After being active in the Naxal movement till 2010, Gaddar later identified himself as an Ambedkarite. He adopted the name Gaddar as a tribute to the pre-independence Gadar party which opposed British colonial rule in Punjab during the 1911
.

Telangana movement 

With the resurgence of Telangana movement, Gadar expressed his support for the cause of a separate Telangana state and those people who were advocating it with the intention of uplifting the lower castes, particularly dalits and also backward castes. He said he was strongly with those who are for a Telangana of social justice where Scheduled Tribes and Scheduled Castes have political representation on par with the OCs and BCs of the state. He expressed his solidarity with Devender Goud's NTPP (Nava Telangana Praja Party) in spite of being shot at by the police during Goud's term as AP Home Minister.

Music

Awards 
Nandi Awards:
1995: Nandi Award for Best Lyricist for "Malletheega Ku Pandiri Vole" from Orey Rikshaw (turned down)
 2011 - Nandi Award for Best Male Playback Singer for Jai Bolo Telangana

See also 
Telangana Praja Front

References

External links 
Gaddar asked to people part in Mission Kakatiya 
 https://web.archive.org/web/20120131021928/http://www.newswala.com/Hyderabad-News/Amalapurams-arrests-an-eye-wash-alleges-Gadar-8629.html

1949 births
Living people
Telugu politicians
Indian male folk singers
People from Medak
Telugu poets
Activists from Telangana
Naxalite–Maoist insurgency
Poets from Telangana
20th-century Indian poets
Indian Marxists